Matt Campanale (born February 14, 1988) is an American former professional ice hockey defenseman who played in the National Hockey League with the New York Islanders. He is from Chester Springs, Pennsylvania.

Playing career
As a youth, Campanale played in the 2001 and 2002 Quebec International Pee-Wee Hockey Tournaments with the Philadelphia Flyers minor ice hockey team.

Campanale played four seasons of collegiate hockey with the New Hampshire Wildcats men's ice hockey team before signing an amateur try-out contract with the Bridgeport Sound Tigers of the American Hockey League following the 2010–11 NCAA season. After two games with the Sound Tigers, Campanale was surprisingly signed to an amateur try-out contract with Bridgeports' NHL affiliate, the New York Islanders, after their defense was overcome with injury.

He made his NHL debut the same day on April 6, 2011, playing over eight minutes on defense and picking up two penalty minutes in a 3-2 loss to the Boston Bruins.

In his first full professional season in 2011–12, Campanale signed in the ECHL with the Bakersfield Condors. After 8 games he was traded to fellow ECHL competitor the Elmira Jackals, where he remained for the majority of the season. On July 23, 2012, Campanale re-signed with the Jackals to a one-year extension.

On August 8, 2013, Campanale moved to his fourth ECHL club, signing a one-year deal with reigning champions the Reading Royals.

Despite re-signing with the Royals for a second season on August 20, 2014, Campanalae opted to leave for Europe in signing a one-year deal with Italian Serie A club, Hockey Milano Rossoblu.

Career statistics

References

External links
 

1988 births
American men's ice hockey defensemen
Bakersfield Condors (1998–2015) players
Binghamton Senators players
Bridgeport Sound Tigers players
Elmira Jackals (ECHL) players
Ice hockey players from Pennsylvania
Las Vegas Wranglers players
Living people
New Hampshire Wildcats men's ice hockey players
New York Islanders players
People from Chester County, Pennsylvania
Reading Royals players
Undrafted National Hockey League players